Paul Ştefan Batin (born 29 June 1987) is a Romanian footballer who plays as a striker. In his career, Batin also played for teams such as FCM Baia Mare, Miedź Legnica, FC Botoșani or Concordia Chiajna, among others.

Career statistics

Honours

Club
FC Baia Mare
 Liga III (1): 2008–09

References

External links
 
 

1987 births
Sportspeople from Baia Mare
Living people
Romanian footballers
Association football forwards
Liga I players
Liga II players
Liga III players
CS Minaur Baia Mare (football) players
CFR Cluj players
FC UTA Arad players
CS Pandurii Târgu Jiu players
FC Brașov (1936) players
FC Botoșani players
FC Dinamo București players
CS Concordia Chiajna players
I liga players
Miedź Legnica players
Cypriot First Division players
Doxa Katokopias FC players
Romanian expatriate footballers
Expatriate footballers in Poland
Romanian expatriate sportspeople in Poland
Expatriate footballers in Cyprus
Romanian expatriate sportspeople in Cyprus